Holek is brand of revolvers made by Czech company ALFA - PROJ. This firearm is light and reliable, due to a combination of both a light-alloy frame and a steel barrel. It is used by the Czech Police as a backup gun.

The barrel of a Holek revolver can range from 2 to 6 inches and can hold up to 6 rounds.

Revolvers of Czechoslovakia